Protest Songs 1924–2012 is the ninth studio album by the English ska revival band The Specials. It is the second Specials album led by the trio of Lynval Golding, Terry Hall and Horace Panter. The album entered at number 2 on the UK Albums Chart after its first week of release and spent two weeks on the chart.

The album is the last to feature Hall as lead vocalist prior to his death in December 2022 at age 63.

Track listing
 "Freedom Highway" (Pops Staples) – 3:24
 "Everybody Knows" (Leonard Cohen, Sharon Robinson) – 5:23
 "I Don't Mind Failing in This World" (Malvina Reynolds) – 4:40
 "Black, Brown and White" (Big Bill Broonzy) – 2:57
 "Ain't Gonna Let Nobody Turn Us Around" (Traditional/Clarence Carter White) – 3:46
 "Fuck All the Perfect People" (Chip Taylor) – 4:05
 "My Next Door Neighbor" (Jerry McCain) – 2:33
 "Trouble Every Day" (Frank Zappa) – 5:04
 "Listening Wind" (Brian Eno, David Byrne) – 4:05
 "I Live in a City" (Malvina Reynolds) – 2:20
 "Soldiers Who Want to Be Heroes" (Rod McKuen) – 2:51
 "Get Up, Stand Up" (Bob Marley, Peter Tosh) – 4:07

LP bonus 7" vinyl
 "Vote for Me" (Live at Coventry Cathedral) (Hall, Panter, Golding, Larsen) – 4:01
 "Blam Blam Fever" (Live at Coventry Cathedral) (Earl Grant, V. E. Grant) – 5:40

Personnel

The Specials
 Lynval Golding – electric guitar, acoustic guitar, vocals
 Terry Hall – vocals
 Horace Panter – bass guitar, stand-up bass

Additional musicians
Steve Cradock – electric guitar, acoustic guitar, vocals
Hannah Hu – guest vocals
Jim Hunt – saxophone
Pablo Mendelssohn – flugelhorn
Michael "Bami" Rose – repeater drum
Kenrick Rowe – drums, percussion
Tim Smart – trombone
Nikolaj Torp Larsen – keyboards, harmonica, guitar, accordion, vocals
Tony Uter – bass drum

Technical
Horace Panter, Lynval Golding, Nikolaj Torp Larsen, Terry Hall – producer, arrangements
George Murphy – engineer
Liam Larkin – assistant engineer
Cenzo Townshend – mixing
Camden Clarke, Robert Sellens – mixing assistant
Shane O'Neill – photography
De Facto – graphic design

Charts

References

The Specials albums
2021 albums
Island Records albums